Cham Jangal or Cham-e Jangal may refer to:
 Cham Jangal, Chaharmahal and Bakhtiari
 Cham Jangal, Ilam